Yug Dekhi Yug Samma ( is a 1988  Nepalese film directed by Deepak Rayamajhi and starring Rajesh Hamal, and Kristi. This is Hamal's first Nepali movie as a lead actor.

Premise 
The film concerns the romance of a young couple, amidst the pressure of their family rivalries are bound to a path which seemed irreversible.

Cast 
 Rajesh Hamal as Aasheesh
 Kristi as Kanchan
 Tika Pahari as Trilok Chandra Thapa, Kanchan's father
 Sushila Rayamajhi
 Madan Das Shrestha
 Rachana Singh
 Gopal Raj Mainali
 Mohan Niraula
 Gopal Bhutani
 Narendra Thapa
 Santu Tamang
 N.B. Maharjan
 Pradeep Singh
 Srawan Kumar Acharya as Fighting Artist

Songs

 Andhile Rokna Sakdaina
 Nachyo Maichang
 Ma Nachchu
 Teen Pate Dada
 Man Bhitra
 Man Bhitra(sad)

External links

References 

1991 films
Nepali-language films
1991 drama films
Nepalese action films